Line 14 of the Shenzhen Metro is an express rapid transit line in Shenzhen. Line 14 is envisioned as an urban express line with higher operating top speeds and wider stop spacings, additionally Line 14 serves as the express relief line to the congested Line 3. The line is equipped with automatic train operation using high capacity 8 car type A trains. To improve journey times a number of express and direct express runs (which only run bound for Gangxia North in the AM peak) were introduced in December.

Opening timeline

Stations

Rolling stock
Line 14 use automatic train operation with GoA4 construction standard.

References

Shenzhen Metro lines